Molson Lake Airport  is located  northwest of Molson Lake, Manitoba, Canada. The airstrip services Molson Lake Lodge and is maintained by the workers at the lodge.

References

Registered aerodromes in Manitoba